Norddeutscher Lloyd (NDL;  North German Lloyd) was a German shipping company. It was founded by Hermann Henrich Meier and Eduard Crüsemann in Bremen on 20 February 1857. It developed into one of the most important German shipping companies of the late 19th and early 20th centuries, and was instrumental in the economic development of Bremen and Bremerhaven. On 1 September 1970, the company merged with Hamburg America Line (HAPAG) to form Hapag-Lloyd AG.

History

Establishment of the NDL

The German shipping company North German Lloyd (NDL) was founded by the Bremen merchants Hermann Henrich Meier and Eduard Crüsemann on 20 February 1857, after the dissolution of the Ocean Steam Navigation Company, a joint German-American enterprise. The new shipping company had no association with the British maritime classification society Lloyd's Register; in the mid-19th century, "Lloyd" was used as a term for a shipping company (an earlier user of the term in the same context was the Trieste-based Österreichischer Lloyd).

H. H. Meier became NDL's first chairman of the supervisory board, and Crüsemann became the first director of the company (German Aktiengesellschaft – AG). Crüsemann was in charge of both cargo services and passenger transport, which, as a result of emigration, was growing significantly. The company was also active in other areas, including tugboats, bathing, insurance, and ship repair (the last of which it still provides). The first office of the shipping company was located at number 13 Martinistraße in Bremen.

The company started with a route to England prior to starting a transatlantic service. In 1857, the first ship, the Adler (Eagle), began regular passenger service between the Weser region (where Bremen is located) and England. On 28 October 1857, it made its maiden voyage from Nordenham to London.

Just one year later, regular, scheduled services were started between the new port in Bremerhaven and New York using two  steamships, the Bremen and the New York. International economic crises made the start of the NDL extremely difficult, and the company took losses until 1859. During the succeeding years, passenger connections to Baltimore and New Orleans were added to the schedule, and the company first rented and then in 1869 bought facilities on the waterfront in Hoboken, New Jersey.

In 1867–1868, NDL began a partnership with the Baltimore and Ohio Railroad, which initiated the Baltimore Line; until 1978, this had its own ships. In 1869, Crüsemann died at only 43 years old. From 1877 to 1892, the director of NDL was Johann Georg Lohmann. He established a new policy for the company, emphasizing fast liners. Eventually H. H. Meier and Lohmann fell out over the direction of the company. In 1892, a  twin-screw steamer, the company's first, was christened the H.H. Meier after the founder; this helped to heal the breach between them.

Foundation of the German Empire

During the Gründerzeit at the beginning of the German Empire, the NDL expanded greatly. Thirteen new ships of the "Strassburg class" were ordered. A route to the West Indies offered from 1871 to 1874 proved unprofitable, but was followed by a permanent line to the east coast of South America. On the transatlantic route, the HAPAG, the Holland-America Line, and the Red Star Line were now all fierce rivals.

In 1885, the NDL won the commission to provide postal service between the German Empire and Australia and the Far East. The associated subsidy underwrote further expansion, beginning with the first large-scale order placed with a German shipyard, for three postal steamers for the major routes and three smaller steamers for branch service from AG Vulcan Stettin. It was in fact a requirement of the commission that the ships be built in Germany.

By 1890, with 66 ships of a total , NDL was the second largest shipping company in the world, after the British Peninsular and Oriental Steam Navigation Company, with 48 ships of a total , and dominated shipping to Germany, with 31.6% of the traffic. NDL was also the carrying more transatlantic passengers to New York than any other company, due to its dominance in steerage, which consisted mostly of immigrants. In cabin class, it carried only slightly more passengers than the British Cunard Line and White Star Line. 42% of NDL's passenger traffic was to New York, and 15% to other US ports, but only 16.2% eastward-bound from New York. Its westbound South Atlantic service represented 17.3% of its passengers; eastbound from South America, only 1.7%.

In 1887, the NDL withdrew from the route to England in favor of Argo Reederei, but continued to provide tug services through participation beginning in 1899 in the Schleppschifffahrtsgesellschaft Unterweser (Unterweser Tug Association, now Unterweser Reederei).

Expansion and dominance

H. H. Meyer stood down from the board in 1888; he was succeeded by Friedrich Reck. Johann Georg Lohmann became director of the company; following his death in 1892, Reck stepped down and Georg Plate became chairman. The lawyer Heinrich Wiegand became Director; from 1899 onwards, his title was Director General. He held this position until 1909, and presided over appreciable expansion.

In 1897, with the commissioning of SS Kaiser Wilhelm der Große, the NDL finally had a major ship for the North Atlantic. This was the largest and fastest ship in the world, and the company benefited from the reputation advantage of the Blue Riband for the fastest Atlantic crossing, with an average speed of 22.3 knots. With these the company offered a regular service across the Atlantic to its docks at Hoboken, New Jersey, across the Hudson River from New York. On June 30, 1900 over 300 Dock workers and people were killed in a fire at the Hoboken docks.

So began the "decade of Germans" in transatlantic shipping, in which the NDL and the HAPAG dominated the routes with several record-breaking ships and vied with the British Cunard Line and the White Star Line as the largest shipping companies in the world. In 1907, and then in 1909, both of the British Cunard Line, won the Blue Riband back for the British, and Mauretania then retained it until 1929.

Between 1894 and 1908, NDL ordered many other freight and passenger steamers from several German yards.

NDL in the 20th century

Beginning in 1899, the NDL expanded into the Pacific, acquiring the entire fleets of two small British lines, the Scottish Oriental Steamship Company and the Holt East Indian Ocean Steamship Company, and setting up between 14 and 16 passenger and freight routes in conjunction with the postal service.  In 1900, 14 of NDL's passenger ships were requisitioned as troop transports due to the Boxer Rebellion in China; on 27 July, Kaiser Wilhelm II delivered his "Schrecklichkeit" speech, in which he compared the military of the German Empire to the Huns, at the departure ceremony for Friedrich Der Grosse. This inspired Britain later, when they seized a number of German ships, to rename them to names beginning with "Hun", such as "Huntsgreen" and "Huntsend". In German, these ships were collectively named "Hunnendampfer" (Huns' steamers).

At the beginning of the 20th century, the U.S. banking magnate J. P. Morgan began to acquire a number of shipping companies, including the White Star Line, the Leyland Line, and the Red Star Line, to build a transatlantic monopoly. He succeeded in signing both HAPAG and NDL to an alliance, but was unable to acquire the British Cunard Line, and the French Compagnie Générale Transatlantique (CGT). HAPAG and NDL gave Morgan the largest U.S. rail company, the Baltimore and Ohio Railroad, and so Morgan offered to divide the market. The Holland-America Line and the Red Star Line together divided a contract for the passengers of the four companies. Ruinous competition was prevented. In 1912, the Morgan Agreement was terminated.

In 1907, the Norddeutscher Lloyd's fiftieth anniversary, it had 93 vessels, 51 smaller vessels, two sail training vessels and other river steamers. NDL had around 15,000 employees. Because of the high investment costs and an international economic crisis, the shipping company celebrated at this time but also had considerable financial difficulties.

Despite the financial difficulties, between 1907 and 1910 the company built a new headquarters on Papenburgstrasse in Bremen, the prestigious NDL Building to plans by architect Johann Poppe, who was also the lead interior designer for the company's liners. The building, the largest in the city at the time, was in eclectic Renaissance Revival style with a tower. It was sold in 1942 to Deutsche Schiff- und Maschinenbau and when the company was broken up into its constituent parts after World War II, passed to AG Weser. The building had been severely damaged by bombing and was demolished and a Horten department store built on the site in 1969. The adjacent new shopping mall bears the name Lloyd Passage.

Finally in 1914 the company ordered two  liners of the Columbus class; World War I prevented their completion.

In this era of "open borders" to transatlantic travel, the largest passenger group making the transatlantic crossing were immigrants from Europe to the United States, and NDL carried more than any other steamship line. The economic downturn following the Panic of 1907 led to a sharp fall-off of migrant traffic to America, only partially offset by increased steerage flows back to Europe, and this was the main contributing factor to "one of the blackest years in the Company's history."

In 1914, NDL employed approximately 22,000 people. Its success thus directly influenced the rapid growth of the city of Bremerhaven, which had been founded only in 1827.

Director General Dr. Wiegand died in 1909, and was succeeded by Director Phillip Heineken until 1920.

NDL's routes around 1907

This is a list of routes served by NDL in 1907.

Europe – America

 Bremerhaven – New York
 Bremerhaven – Baltimore
 Bremerhaven – Savannah
 Bremerhaven – Galveston
 Bremerhaven – Cuba
 Bremerhaven – La Plata ports
 Bremerhaven – Brazil
 Genoa – New York

Mediterranean

 Marseilles – Alexandria

Europe – Asia/Australia

 Bremerhaven – East Asia
 Bremerhaven – Australia

Asia / Australia (including coastal routes)

 Hong Kong – Japan – New Guinea
 Hong Kong – Bangkok
 Hong Kong – Bangkok (via Singapore)
 Hong Kong Straits
 Hong Kong – South Philippines
 Penang – Deli
 Deli – Singapore
 Singapore – Bangkok
 Singapore – South Philippines
 Singapore – Moluccas (on Borneo)
 Singapore – Moluccas (on Celebes)
 Shanghai – Hankow
 Australia – Japan – Manila – Hong Kong

German coast

Daytrip service on the Baltic coast
Tug service Bremen – Hamburg and Bremen – Bremerhaven
Passenger shipping Bremen – Bremerhaven

World War I

For NDL as a civilian shipping line, the beginning of World War I was a trial, as well as a logistical challenge because a large part of the fleet was at sea around the World. However, most ships were able to reach neutral ports. The logistical operations of NDL in Bremerhaven were placed almost exclusively at the service of the German Navy. NDL owned a majority interest in the Deutsche Ozean-Reederei ("German Ocean Shipping Service"), which used U-boats for trade and made some successful Atlantic crossings.

Post war
The United States had already confiscated in 1917 the facilities in Hoboken and the NDL ships at the dock there. The prewar NDL fleet no longer existed. The company was left with some small ships totalling . With these the company restarted daytrip passenger service, tug service, and freight service in 1919. The 'flagship' was the 781-ton Grüß Gott. From 1920 to 1939, NDL participated in the Seedienst Ostpreußen passenger and goods service to East Prussia.

In 1920, an air transport subsidiary was founded and soon merged with Sablatnig Flugzeugbau GmbH to form Lloyd Luftverkehr Sablatnig. In 1923 this combined with HAPAG's air transport subsidiary to form Deutscher Aero Lloyd, which on 6 January 1926 merged with Junkers Luftverkehr AG to become Deutsche Luft Hansa A.G., the predecessor of Lufthansa.

In August 1920, the NDL made an agency agreement with the U.S. Mail Steamship Co. (beginning in 1921, United States Lines). This made it possible to resume transatlantic service from Bremerhaven to New York with the former Rhein, now sailing under the US flag as the Susquehanna. The unfinished Columbus had been awarded to Great Britain after the war and was bought in 1920 by White Star, which had lost significant tonnage in the war and also wished to make up for the pre-war loss of the Titanic. Work at Danzig proceeded very slowly. Finally in autumn 1921 the so-called Columbus Agreement was reached, under which the German government and NDL undertook to facilitate rapid completion of the Columbus in exchange for the British government returning ownership to the NDL of six smaller ships which had spent the war years in South America: the postal steamers Seydlitz and Yorck, the Gotha, and the freighters Göttingen, Westfalen and Holstein. The company also began to build new freighters and passenger ships and to buy back other ships. In late 1921, service to South America was resumed with the Seydlitz, and in early 1922, East Asian service with the Westfalen. On 12 February 1922, service to New York with NDL's own ships resumed with Seydlitz. The other ship of the Columbus class, the  former Hindenburg, was completed in 1924 and named Columbus; she was placed in scheduled transatlantic passenger service.

A brief post-war boom was followed by severe inflation in Germany, despite which NDL continued to expand their fleet.

In 1920, Carl Stimming became director general of NDL, while his predecessor Heineken became chairman of the board. Between 1925 and 1928, the company acquired a number of German shipping companies: HABAL, the Roland Line, and Argo. The acquisition of the Roland Line brought Ernst Glässel onto the board of directors, where he was to have increasing influence. In 1926, the company were once more able to pay a dividend. American credit financed continuing expansion and orders for new ships.

In 1929 and 1930, the company placed its two largest ships in service, SS Bremen and SS Europa. With an average speed of about 27.9 knots, both were to take the Blue Riband for the fastest Atlantic crossings. In 1929, Columbus was completely refitted.

From 1928 to 1939, the volume of passengers travelling between the US and Europe declined sharply. In 1928, the NDL transported about 8% of a passenger volume of 1,168,414 passengers; in 1932, 16.2% of the 751,592 passengers transported; in 1938, around 11% of 685,655 passengers. In addition, there was significant new competition from new Italian, French and British superliners: the Italian SS Rex and SS Conte di Savoia, the French SS Normandie, and the British RMS Queen Mary.

The 1929 economic crisis which began in the US affected the German shipping companies. The NDL and the HAPAG therefore entered into a cooperation agreement in 1930, and beginning in 1935, instituted joint operations in the North Atlantic. The first signs of a merger were visible. By 1932, the NDL was in an economic crisis, with about 5,000 employees let go, salary cuts, and red ink. Glässel was dismissed. The government placed both NDL and HAPAG in trusteeship under Siegfried von Roedern, and following the death of Stimming, Heinrich F. Albert briefly became head of the NDL, followed after some eighteen months by the National Socialist Rudolph Firle. Bremen State Councillor Karl Lindemann was chairman of the board from 1933 to 1945. A programme of economic recovery by divestments and restructuring was initiated. HBAL and the Roland Line became independent companies once more, and other lines took over services to Africa and the Mediterranean. The Nazi regime ordered both NDL and HAPAG to relinquish ships to other lines which were to operate in their regions without competition from other German companies, in particular to Hamburg Süd, the Deutsche Afrika-Linien and the Deutsche Levante Linie.

The modernization of the fleet continued and in 1937 the line made modest profits.

In 1939 the  slipped out of Lyttelton Harbour (New Zealand) on 28 August, on the eve of World War II, ostensibly for Port Kembla, New South Wales, where she was to have filled her coal bunkers for the homeward passage to Europe. She then headed for the subantarctic Auckland Islands, where she successfully evaded the cruiser , and re-stocked with food and wood. The freighter then made a desperate and successful escape, using jury-rigged sails, to Valparaíso, Chile, in South America.

Nine further freighters were completed after the outbreak of World War II. This entire fleet was either lost during the war or awarded to the Allies as reparations. Columbus had to be sunk in 1939; Bremen burned in 1941; Steuben was sunk in the Baltic in 1945 with the loss of some 4,000 lives; Europa, claimed by France, became the Liberté in 1947.

The Reich was the primary stockholder in the company, but in 1941/42, NDL was once more privatized and cigarette manufacturer Philipp Reemtsma became primary stockholder. Dr. Johannes Kulenkampff, a board member since 1932, and Richard Bertram, a board member since 1937, became Chairman in 1942.

After World War II
At the end of World War II the company's headquarters (which had in any case been sold in 1942) had been severely damaged by bombing and all its large vessels either destroyed or seized. It was left with only the freighter Bogotá, which was in Japan. Relicensed by the American military administration on November 29, 1945 as a "coastal shipping and stevedoring company," it started again, as after World War I, practically from zero, offering tugboat and daytripper services. Kulenkampff and Bertram constituted the Board and there were at first only 350 employees. In 1948, the first Hapag-Lloyd travel agency opened. Business initially consisted of emigration and a limited amount of tourism. In 1950, the NDL placed its first post-war orders at the Bremer Vulkan shipyard, the Rheinstein class (13 knots).

After the limitations on German shipping imposed by the Allies were lifted in 1951, the NDL commenced building a new fleet. The line had routes to Canada, New Orleans, the Canary Islands, and beginning in 1953 to the Far East.

Passenger service resumed in 1955 using a rebuilt 1924 Swedish ship, the  MS Gripsholm. Renamed Berlin, she was the sixth German ship of that name, the fourth at NDL, and sailed North Atlantic routes. In 1959, the company added the  Bremen (formerly Pasteur), and in 1965, the  Europa (formerly Kungsholm), Gripsholm'''s sister ship bought from the Swedish American Line, with a capacity of 843 passengers. These vessels were first placed in scheduled service to America but soon transferred to cruising. In 1967, the  express freighter Friesenstein (21.5 knots) inaugurated the Friesenstein class and replaced Nabob and Schwabenstein. Passenger service was running at an increasing deficit, and the rapidly growing container traffic required cost-intensive retooling in the freight business. In 1968 NDL inaugurated container service to the USA with the  Weser-Express; two more container ships were soon added.

Around 1960, NDL had 47 ships, a number that remained almost unchanged until 1970. In 1970, NDL had a turnover of 515 million DM and share capital of 54 million DM, and employed 6,200 people, 3,500 of them at sea. 
 
In 1967, Claus Wätjen and Dr. Horst Willner, and in 1969 Karl-Heinz Sager, joined the Board. Kulenkampff served on the Board until 1968 and Bertram until 1970. Since the NDL was already executing three quarters of its freight business in association with HAPAG, a merger of the two largest German shipping companies was entirely logical.

On September 1, 1970, the North German Lloyd merged with Hamburg America Line (HAPAG) to form Hapag-Lloyd AG, based in Hamburg with secondary headquarters in Bremen.Drechsel, p. xii.

On 20 February 2007, a small group of dedicated, former member of the North German Lloyd organized for the 150th anniversary of the foundation of the shipping company a meeting at the Bremer Ratskeller. This event was very popular, so it was decided to carry out in the following years further meetings. – Meanwhile, the meetings take place annually on the twentieth of February in Bremen in the former Lloyd's building – today Courtyard Marriott hotel.

Legacy

 The new company has Lloyd as part of its name.
 The Lloyd Werft in Bremerhaven, with its headquarters in the former laundry facility, continues the memory of the NDL.
 The former company headquarters on Papenstraße was demolished and replaced by a department store in 1969, but the Große Hundestraße on one side of the site was the first street in Bremen to be privatized, and has been roofed with glass to become a pedestrian mall. It is called Lloyd Passage.
 The Lloyd baggage department building or Lloyd station on Gustav Deetjen Allee at the main station in Bremen, built in 1913 to Rudolph Jacobs' design, became Hapag-Lloyd's secondary headquarters. The NDL's company emblem adorns the main entrance. Almost all company buildings are now in Hamburg and Hanover.
 The Lloyd Dynamowerke (LDW) in Bremen
 Buildings in Bremen and Bremerhaven still bear the marks of former use by the NDL.
 The Bremer Bank, now absorbed by Commerzbank, was founded by Meier to provide financing.

Major people

 Hermann Henrich Meier, founder and 1857–1888 first Supervisory Board Chairman of the NDL
 Eduard Crüsemann; 1857–1869 founder and first director of NDL
 August Hermann Friedrich Neynaber alias HFA or HAF called Hermann Neynaber; (1822–1899) captain of many liners from 1866 to 1881 (Bremen, Deutschland, Donau, Mosel, Kronprinz Friedrich Wilhelm, Rhein)
 Johann Georg Lohmann, 1877–1892 Director of NDLPaul Neubaur: Der Norddeutsche Lloyd. 50 Jahre der Entwicklung 1857–1907. Band I, Fr. Wilh. Grunow, Leipzig 1907. Page 44
 Hermann Friedrich Bremermann; 1868–1892 Director of the NDL
 Willy Christoffers; Captain from 1886 to 1900
 Georg Plate, from 1887 to the Supervisory Board of the NDL, 1892–1911 Chairman of the NDL
 Dr. Heinrich Wiegand; 1892–1899 Director and 1899–1909 Director-General of NDL
 Charles Polack, captain in 1913 of the SS Kronprinzessin Cecilie
 Dr. Philipp Heineken, Director-General in 1909–1920, 1920–1933 Chairman of the Supervisory Board of NDL
 Carl Joachim Stimming, Director General, 1921–31
 Arnold Petzet; from 1906 to 1927 on NDL's board, responsible for transport within Germany, establishment of the cruise sector
 Ernst Glässel; 1926 member of the Lloyd Executive Board, 1931–1932 Chairman of the Board
 Dietrich Hogemann, commodore who retired in 1913
 Paul König, 1911 captain, 1916 captain of the U-boat, 1920–1932 Head of the marine department of the NDL
 Nikolaus Johnsen, captain and commodore in 1924 of the Columbus, and in 1930 Europe (III)
 Leopold Ziegenbein, captain and commodore of Bremen (IV)
 Oskar Scharf, captain on the Europa (III)
 Adolf Ahrens, captain and commodore of Columbus and Bremen (IV)
 Dr. Heinrich F. Albert, 1932–1933 Director General of the NDL
 Friedrich Johann Gottfried Hubert Paffrath, 1929-1941  Superintendent 
 Karl Lindemann (ex State Council), 1933–1945 Chairman of the Supervisory Board of NDL
 Dr. Rudolph Firle, 1933–1944. Director General of the NDL
 Dr. Johnannes Kulenkampff; from 1932 Board Member, from 1942 Executive Board member
 Richard Bertram; from 1937 Board Member, from 1942 Executive Board member
 Paul Hampel, director of ship maintenance of the NDL of about 1950 to 1970
 Heinrich Lorenz, captain of the Berlin (IV)
 Günter Rössing, captain of the Bremen (V)

Fleet

This is a list of all ships in service of the NDL. Some of the ships were owned previously by other companies.

References

Further reading
 Buchholz, Jörn/Focke, Harald: Auf Lloyd-Frachtern. Erinnerungen 1957 bis 1964. Hauschild, Bremen, 2007, 
 Focke, Harald: Bremens letzte Liner. Die großen Passagierschiffe des Norddeutschen Lloyd nach 1945. Hauschild, Bremen, 2002, 
 Focke, Harald: Mit dem Lloyd nach New York. Erinnerungen an die Passagierschiffe BERLIN, BREMEN und EUROPA. Hauschild, Bremen, 2004, 
 Focke, Harald:  Im Liniendienst auf dem Atlantik. Neue Erinnerungen an die Passagierschiffe BERLIN, BREMEN und EUROPA des Norddeutschen Lloyd. Hauschild, Bremen, 2006, 
 Kludas, Arnold: Die Seeschiffe des Norddeutschen Lloyd: 1857–1970 (2 vols). Koehlers Verlagsgesellschaft mbH, Herford, 1991 / 1992
 Reinke-Kunze, Christiane: Die Geschichte der Reichs-Post-Dampfer-Verbindung zwischen den Kontinenten 1886-11914, Herford 1994, .
 Wiborg, Susanne,  und Klaus Wiborg: 1847–1997, Mein Feld ist die Welt – 150 Jahre Hapag-Lloyd, Hapag-Lloyd AG, Hamburg 1997.
 Rübner, Hartmut: Konzentration und Krise der deutschen Schiffahrt. Maritime Wirtschaft im Kaiserreich, in der Weimarer Republik und im Nationalsozialismus. Hauschild, Bremen 2005
 Thiel, Reinhold: Die Geschichte des Norddeutschen Lloyd: 1857–1970 (5 vols). Hauschild, Bremen 2001
 Witthöft, Hans Jürgen: Norddeutscher Lloyd. Koehlers Verlagsgesellschaft mbH, Herford, 1973, 
 Dirk J. Peters (Hrsg.): Der Norddeutsche Lloyd – Von Bremen in die Welt – „Global Player“ der Schifffahrtsgeschichte''. Hauschild, Bremen, 2007,

External links

 Fleet information 
 Gallery of NDL's fleets at Norway-Heritage
 Norddeutscher Lloyd Bremen Passenger Lists 1881-1938 GG Archives
 Postcards of NDL
 SS DRESDEN
 The Last Ocean Liners – North German Lloyd – trade routes and ships of North German Lloyd in the 1950s and 60s
 
North German Lloyd History and Ephemera GG Archives 1881-1927 1928-1935 1936-1995

 
Shipping companies of Germany
Transatlantic shipping companies
Companies based in Hamburg
Defunct companies of Germany
Transport in Bremen (state)
Transport companies established in 1857
Transport companies disestablished in 1970
1857 establishments in Germany
1857 establishments in Bremen
1970 disestablishments in West Germany